The Montesano Formation is a geologic formation in Washington (state). It preserves fossils dating back to the Neogene period.

See also

 List of fossiliferous stratigraphic units in Washington (state)
 Paleontology in Washington (state)

References
 

Neogene geology of Washington (state)